Continuous Portrait is the third studio album by American musical ensemble Inventions. It was released on May 29, 2020 under Temporary Residence Records.

Critical reception
Continuous Portrait was met with "generally favorable" reviews from critics. At Metacritic, which assigns a weighted average rating out of 100 to reviews from mainstream publications, this release received an average score of 80, based on 5 reviews.

Track listing

References

2020 albums
Temporary Residence Limited albums